The Black Pockau ( or Schwarzwasser) is a river of Saxony, Germany, in the Ore Mountains. It is a left tributary of the Flöha.

Its murky waters flowing from bogs in the hills give the river a dark colour. The name Pockau, which was recorded in similar form in 1292, probably comes from the Czech and means "opposed", i.e. a stream flowing from Bohemia towards the north.

Course 
The Black Pockau rises 890 metres above sea level (NHN) in a raised bog northeast of the Jelení hora in the Bohemian Ore Mountains. The  (German: Assigbach), which flows into the Czech Republic, also has its source here.

After , the stream reaches the German-Czech border at the old road between Přísečnice (Preßnitz) and Kalek (Kallich) and flows through the Satzung municipal pond (Satzunger Gemeindeteich).

In Reitzenhain, from the rafting pond (Floßteich) by the Neue Welt mill, a ditch known as the  provided water from the Black Pockau for overshot waterwheels at the old mines near Marienberg. Water is also diverted from the river at the eastern end of Kühnhaide: the Green Ditch once fed water for overshot wheels at the mine on the Wildsberg mountain near Pobershau. The village of Kienhaid (Načetín I), that formerly stood on the Bohemian side of the border here, was abandoned. East of Kühnhaide the river changes direction from northeast to north.

The next section of the valley as far as the Kniebreche, the gorge-like Schwarzwasser valley (Schwarzwassertal), is considered one of the most picturesque of German valleys in the Central Uplands and is protected as the Schwarzwassertal nature reserve. These plans, however, were shelved.

In running through this ravine-like valley, the river passes historically important witnesses to the settlement of the Ore Mountains located on the left and right banks or in the nearby vicinity.

In the remote Pobershau scattered village of Hinterer Grund a hydropower station is fed by water from an artificial ditch or Kunstgraben. This is the location of the Pobershau conservation station, which offers support to those interested in nature. At the Kniebreche near Rittersberg the river is joined by the Red Pockau. From here on, in old maps, the river is  just known as the Pockau or Große Pockau (Great Pockau).

North of the Kniebreche on both sides of the river are more historic sites.

Near Niederlauterstein, where the Lautenbach stream joins the river, the Black Pockau passes the ruins of Lauterstein Castle. Further north the Knesenbach, which rises near  (a district of Marienberg), empties into the river. Here there is a water gauge belonging to the Saxon State Office for the Environment and Geology; its readings are taken regularly and available on the internet. In the municipality of Pockau the Black Pockau finally empties into the Flöha.

Economic use 
In addition to the water diverted by historic ditches for mining purposes, below Kühnhaide and near the Kniebreche are two active weirs that use the river's water power. Their use has been questioned because of their effect on the river bed.

Tourism and sport 

Walking and cycling through the Schwarzwasser valley are possible, both along the river and the along the Grüner Graben on the hillside above the river.

The river is suitable for canoeing and white water rafting. The "classic"  continuous section between Hinterer Grund and Pockau is even navigable at relatively low water levels. By contrast, several kilometres of challenging white water between Kühnhaide (start) and Hinterer Grund require high water levels.

Fishing is possible with a permit on the section from Pobershau as far as the confluence with the Flöha. The main species are rainbow trout, brown trout, brook trout, eel and various minnows.

Exceptional high water 
 5 July 1999 after regional storms
 12 August 2002 during the flooding of the Elbe

See also 
List of rivers of Saxony

External links 
 Current river gauge at Zöblitz / Black Pockau
 Schwarzwasser valley

Rivers of the Ústí nad Labem Region
Rivers of Saxony
Rivers of the Ore Mountains
Rivers of Germany
International rivers of Europe
Czech Republic–Germany border
Border rivers